is a railway station on the Muroran Main Line in Tomakomai, Hokkaidō, Japan, operated by the Hokkaido Railway Company (JR Hokkaido). It is numbered "H20".

Lines
Itoi Station is served by the Muroran Main Line.

Station layout
The unstaffed station consists of two side platforms serving two tracks.

Adjacent stations

Accidents
A 15-year-old junior high school student was killed at the station on 26 December 2011 after being hit by the non-stop Super Hokuto No. 9 limited express train service from Hakodate to Sapporo while crossing the tracks with a bicycle.

Surrounding area
 National Route 36
 Shirakaba Onsen (hot spring)

References

Railway stations in Hokkaido Prefecture
Railway stations in Japan opened in 1917